The Student Academy Awards are presented by the Academy of Motion Picture Arts and Sciences in an annual competition for college and university filmmakers.

Description 

The awards were originally named the Student Film Awards and were first presented in 1973. Since 1975, the awards have been given annually, usually in June. The current name was adopted effective in 1991.

The awards offer prizes in four categories: alternative (experimental film), animation, documentary, and narrative. Gold, silver, and bronze awards may be given in each category, with accompanying cash grants of $5,000, $3,000, and $2,000, respectively, as of 2005. Since 1981, a separate award has been given annually to a student filmmaker from outside the United States - however in the 49th annual SAA (2022), the academy has merged its domestic and international categories to provide everyone with an equal footing. This reduced the 7 categories (4 domestic & 3 international) into 4 = narrative, animation, alternative/ experimental and documentary.

Several award winners have gone on to significant achievement as filmmakers, including Robert Zemeckis, Bob Saget, Spike Lee, Trey Parker, Pete Docter and John Lasseter. Some of the award-winning student films have themselves been nominated for and/or won the Academy Award in the short film categories, including Chicks in White Satin, The Janitor, Karl Hess: Toward Liberty, The Lunch Date, 9, Quiero ser (I want to be...), Gang Cops, The Death of Kevin Carter: Casualty of the Bang Bang Club, The Red Jacket, On the Line (Auf der Strecke), God of Love, The Confession, 4.1 Miles and Dcera (Daughter).

To extend the impact and honor beyond the competition, a compilation presentation of the gold medal award-winning films is circulated each year free of charge to educational and non-profit organizations nationwide.

Copies (and some elements) for over 90% of films honored with Student Academy Awards, along with recordings of many of the awards ceremonies, are held by the Academy Film Archive.

List of winners

1970s

1st Annual Student Film Awards December 20, 1973
 Animation: Anti-matter, Lewis Hall, Carlos Guiterrez-Mena University of California, Los Angeles (Los Angeles)
 Documentary: You See, I've Had a Life, Ben Levin, Mort Jordan Temple University (Philadelphia, Pennsylvania)
 Dramatic: Manhattan Melody, Reuben Trane, Ken WiederhornColumbia University (New York City)
 Special Jury (Dramatic): Norman Nurdelpick's Suspension: A Tribute to Alfred Hitchcock, Bob DahlinNorthwestern University (Evanston, Illinois)

2nd Annual Student Film Awards July 1, 1975
 Animation: Euphoria, Vincent Collins San Francisco Art Institute (San Francisco)
 Documentary: Men's Lives, Josh Hanig, Will Roberts Antioch College (Yellow Springs, Ohio)
 Dramatic: Swag, Bruce Postman New York University School of the Arts (New York City)
 Experimental: Architecture of the Petroleum Age, Scott Thomas Rice University (Houston, Texas)
 Special Jury (Dramatic): A Field of Honor, Robert Zemeckis University of Southern California (Los Angeles)

3rd Annual Student Film Awards June 23, 1976
 Animation: Fame, Mark Kirkland, Richard Jefferies California Institute of the Arts (Valencia, California)
 Documentary: What the Notes Say Karen Grossman, Richard O'Neill Adelphi University (Garden City, New York)
 Dramatic: The Preparatory, Terence Cahalan University of Southern California (Los Angeles)
 Experimental: After Lumiere, Joan Laine University of California, Los Angeles (Los Angeles)
 Special Jury (Documentary): The American Love Affair, Lee M. Rhoads, Jr. University of Southern California (Los Angeles)

4th Annual Student Film Awards May 22, 1977
 Animation: The Muse, Paul W. Demeyer California Institute of the Arts (Valencia, California)
 Documentary:
 Achievement: The Last of the Little Breweries, Frank H. Binney University of Texas at Austin (Austin, Texas)
 Merit: Guitar Craft, Rob Williams Western States Film Institute and Metropolitan State College of Denver (both in Denver, Colorado)
Dramatic: Sixteen Down, Carol L. Dysinger New York University (New York City)
Experimental: TRANSCENdance, Philip W. Pura Boston University (Boston, Massachusetts)

5th Annual Student Film Awards May 21, 1978
Animation: Mother Goose, David Bishop University of Southern California (Los Angeles)
Documentary:
Achievement: The Sixth Week, John Simeon Block New York University (New York City)
Merit: Like Any Child, Only More So, Catherine Allan, Maile Ornellas University of California, Berkeley (Berkeley, California)
Merit: Through Adam's Eyes, Robert Saget Temple University, (Philadelphia, Pennsylvania)
Dramatic: Button, Button, Burton Lee Harry University of Bridgeport (Bridgeport, Connecticut)
Experimental: Triptych, Matthew Patrick Hampshire College (Amherst, Massachusetts)

6th Annual Student Film Awards June 3, 1979
Animation:
Achievement: Lady and the Lamp John Lasseter California Institute of the Arts (Valencia, California)
Merit: The Walrus and the Carpenter, Tomas Gasek, Malcolm G. Spaull Rochester Institute of Technology (Henrietta, New York)
Documentary:
Achievement: Since '45, Michael David Korolenko Boston University (Boston, Massachusetts)
Merit: Cotton Candy and Elephant Stuff, Jan Krawitz, Thomas Ott Temple University (Philadelphia, Pennsylvania)
Merit: Everybody Needs a Forever Home, Mike Simpson University of Texas at Austin (Austin, Texas)
Dramatic: The Writers, Harriotte H. Aaron New York University (New York City)

1980s

7th Annual Student Film Awards June 8, 1980
Animation: Nitemare, John Lasseter California Institute of the Arts
Documentary:
Achievement: Karl Hess: Toward Liberty, Roland Hallé, Peter W. Ladue Boston University
Merit: Crossroads/South Africa: The Struggle Continues, Jonathan Wacks University of California, Los Angeles
Dramatic:
Achievement: Candy Store, Claude Kerven New York University
Honorary: Happy Birthday, Randall Fried University of Southern California
Merit: Murder in a Mist, Lisa Gottlieb Columbia College Chicago (Chicago, Illinois)
Experimental: Sections, Sean Phillips University of Southern California

8th Annual Student Film Awards June 7, 1981
Animation: A Bird's Eye View, Deborah Jo Short San Francisco State University
Documentary:
Achievement: I Remember Barbra, Kevin Burns Boston University
Merit: Jazz, Albert Magnoli University of Southern California
Dramatic:
Achievement: A Man Around the House, Caroline Emmons New York University
Merit: Willie, Coleen Higgins, Ghasem Ebrahimian State University of New York at Purchase
Experimental: Commuter, Michael M. Patterson California Institute of the Arts
Foreign Student Film: Maedeli la brèche, Jaco Van Dormael Institut National Superieur, Belgium

9th Annual Student Film Awards June 6, 1982
Animation:
Achievement: Guess Who's for Dinner, Kathy Zielinski California Institute of the Arts
Merit: The Taming, Bill Jarcho Emerson College
Documentary: Face Value, Michael Kriegsman, Dan Montopoli New York University
Dramatic: For Heaven's Sake, Ken Kwapis University of Southern California 
Foreign Student Film: Zone Surveillee (Monitored Zone), Olivier Langlois Institut National Superieur, Belgium

10th Annual Student Film Awards June 5, 1983
Animation: No One for Chess, Richard Rosser Washington and Lee University
Documentary:
Achievement: The Four Corners: A National Sacrifice Area?, Christopher McLeod, Glenn Switkes University of California, Berkeley
Merit: El Matador, Arturo Ruiz Esparza University of Texas at Austin
Merit: Where Did You Get That Woman, Loretta Smith Columbia College (Chicago, Illinois)
Dramatic:
Achievement: American Taboo, Steve Lustgarten Portland State University
Merit: Children of the Corn, John Robert Woodward, Johnny Stevens University of Texas at Austin
Merit: Joe's Bed-Stuy Barbershop: We Cut Heads, Spike Lee New York University
Experimental: Somnolent Blue, Monica Kendall School of the Art Institute of Chicago
Foreign Student Film: Over My Dead Body, Ingrid Oustrup Jensen National Film School of Denmark

11th Annual Student Film Awards June 10, 1984
Animation:
Achievement: The White Gazelle, Anthony Laudati State University of New York at Purchase
Merit: Mr. Gloom, William G. Kopp California Institute of the Arts
Documentary:
Achievement: Rodin's Balzac, Marilyn Waterman Stanford University
Merit: The Wizard of the Strings, Alan Edelstein, Peter Friedman New York University 
Dramatic:
Achievement: Minors, Alan Kingsberg New York University
Merit: The Lottery Rose, Gregory Popp, Frank Military Northwestern University 
Experimental: Tuscola Moon, Dan Reed University of Illinois at Chicago 
Foreign Student Film: Mother's Wedding, Jenny Wilkes National Film and Television School, Beaconsfield, Buckinghamshire, England

12th Annual Student Film Awards June 16, 1985
Animation: Observational Hazard, William G. Kopp California Institute of the Arts 
Documentary:
Achievement: Burley: Growing Tobacco in America, Robert Henson, Doron Schlair New York University
Merit: On the Rocks, Kathryn Johnston, Iain C. Stobie University of Colorado at Boulder
Merit: Witness to Revolution: The Story of Anna Louise Strong, Lucy Ostrander Stanford University
Dramatic: Heroes, Camille Thomasson University of Southern California
Foreign Student Film: The Leahys: Music Most of All, Peter Weyman York University, Toronto, Canada

13th Annual Student Film Awards June 8, 1986
Animation:
Achievement: Housecats, Peg McClure Moudy De Anza College, Cupertino, California
Merit: Mangia!, Sheila Sofian Rhode Island School of Design
Documentary:
Achievement: Songs of Wool: Vena Tipton's Hooked Rugs, Cathey Edwards California Institute of the Arts 
Merit: The Flapper Story, Lauren Lazin Stanford University 
Merit: Sam, Aaron D. Weisblatt New York University
Dramatic: 
Achievement: Jenny, John Travers University of Bridgeport, Connecticut 
Merit: Chicken Thing, Todd Holland University of California, Los Angeles 
Experimental: The Three Cornered Hat, Angel Gracia Miami Dade Community College 
Foreign Student Film: Come, I Have a Story To Tell You, Frederic Roullier-Gall Institut National Superieur des Arts du Spectacle et Techniques de Diffusion, Belgium

14th Annual Student Film Awards June 7, 1987
Animation: Husband of Rat's Daughter, Karen McCoy Fremuth Rhode Island School of Design 
Documentary: 
Achievement: Silver into Gold, Lynn Mueller Stanford University 
Honorary: Living with AIDS, Tina DiFeliciantonio Stanford University 
Merit: In the Wee Wee Hours, Izak Ben-Meir University of Southern California 
Dramatic:
Achievement: Bird in a Cage, Antonio Zarro CBN University
Merit: Prelude, James Spione State University of New York at Purchase
Experimental: Zebu, William Mitchell Loyola Marymount University, Los Angeles 
Foreign Student Film: See You at Wembley, Frankie Walsh, Mark Herman National Film and Television School, Beaconsfield, England

15th Annual Student Film Awards June 12, 1988
Animation:
Achievement: Cat & Rat, James Richardson Columbia College (Chicago, Illinois)
Merit: Artistic Vision, Richard Quade University of California, Los Angeles
Merit: Cat's Cradle, Temah Nelson Rhode Island School of Design
Merit: Why, Suzanne Dimant California Institute of the Arts
Documentary:
Achievement: Gang Cops, Thomas B. Fleming, Daniel Marks University of Southern California
Merit: Norma Jean, John H Behnke Southern Illinois University
Dramatic:
Achievement: Part VII, Thomas Wallin, Steve Wang New York University
Experimental: 
Achievement: The Anti-Video, Gary Rosenthal Ithaca College
Foreign Student Film: Schmetterlinge (Butterflies), Wolfgang Becker Deutsche Film- und Fernsehakademie Berlin, Berlin, West Germany

16th Annual Student Film Awards June 11, 1989
Animation:
Achievement: Sand Dance, Richard Quade University of California, Los Angeles 
Merit: All in Your Mind, Richard C. Zimmerman Southern Illinois University 
Merit: The Chore, Joe Murray De Anza College 
Documentary:
Achievement: Leila, Shawn Maurer Loyola Marymount University 
Merit: Just Like It Was, Dave Burkhardt Bob Jones University 
Merit: No Hunger in My Home, Nancy Brink Stanford University 
Dramatic:
Achievement: The Yuppie, John H. Behnke, James M. Peterson Southern Illinois University 
Merit: Summer Rain, Howard Slavitt University of Southern California 
Experimental:
Achievement: The Lost Treasure of Captain Cornelius "Deadeye" Tuckett, John Michael Di Jiacomo New York University 
Merit: The Computer Analyst, Gary Rosenthal Ithaca College 
Foreign Student Film: Ropáci (Oilgobblers), Jan Sverák Film and TV School of the Academy of Performing Arts in Prague, Prague, Czechoslovakia

1990s

17th Annual Student Film Awards June 10, 1990
 Animation: 
 Achievement: Watunna, Stacey Steers University of Colorado at Boulder 
 Merit: The Yodel Contest, Andrew Artz University of California, Los Angeles 
 Documentary:
 Achievement: Clowning Around, Kelly Clement, Ellen Osborne San Francisco State University 
 Merit: Alf Landon: My Talk with Papa, Richard Kassebaum University of Southern California
 Merit: Samsara: Death and Rebirth in Cambodia, Ellen Bruno Stanford University
 Dramatic:
 Achievement: The Lunch Date, Adam Davidson Columbia University, New York City 
 Merit: The Blue Men, Denise McKenna, Mark Squier American Film Institute, Los Angeles 
 Merit: Go to Hell, Suzanne V. Johnson Tisch School of the Arts, New York University
 Foreign Student Film: Alaska, Mike van Diem Netherlands Film and Television Academy (Amsterdam, Netherlands
 Directors Guild of America Student Award: Adam Davidson

18th Annual Student Academy Awards June 9, 1991
 Animation:
 Gold Medal: Ode to G.I. Joe, Gregory P. Grant  Brooks Institute 
 Documentary:
 Gold Medal: Twinsburge, OH: Some Kind of Weird Twin Thing, Sue Marcoux Stanford University
 Dramatic: 
 Gold Medal: The Dog Ate It, Steve Pearl Loyola Marymount University 
 Silver Medal: Turtle Races, Jim Lincoln, Lisa Swain Regent University 
 Bronze Medal: Andy's Got a Girlfriend!, Dan Moran, Joel Kuchan Columbia College Chicago (Chicago, Illinois) 
 Foreign Film Award: Once Upon a Time, Zsuzsa Böszörményi Academy of Drama and Film in Budapest, Budapest 
 Directors Guild of America Student Award: Steve Pearl

19th Annual Student Academy Awards June 14, 1992
 Animation: 
 Gold Medal: Next Door, Peter H. Docter California Institute of the Arts 
 Silver Medal: Five Female Persuasions, Peter Hixson American University 
 Bronze Medal: Fur and Feathers, Celia Kendrick Rhode Island School of Design 
 Documentary:
 Gold Medal: Beyond Imagining: Margaret Anderson and the Little Review, Wendy Weinberg Temple University
 Silver Medal: Dolphins: Minds in the Water, Christopher C. Carson Loyola Marymount University 
 Bronze Medal: In and Out of Time, Elizabeth Finlayson Stanford University 
 Dramatic: 
 Gold Medal: The Lady in Waiting, Christian M. Taylor New York University 
 Silver Medal: Eagle Against the Sun, John Akahoshi, Steve Foonberg University of Southern California
 Bronze Medal: Gold Mountain, Rachel Saltz, Kryssa Schemmerling Columbia University 
 Experimental Award:
 Gold Medal: In the Aquarium, Robert Beebe University of California, Los Angeles 
 Foreign Film Award: This Boy's Story, John Roberts, Michele Camarda National Film and Television School, Beaconsfield, England 
 Directors Guild of America Student Award: Christian M. Taylor

20th Annual Student Academy Awards June 13, 1993
 Animation: 
 Gold Medal: Above Average, Jamie Maxfield Rhode Island School of Design
 Silver Medal: American History, Chris Graves, Trey Parker University of Colorado at Boulder
 Bronze Medal: The Wind, Drew King California Institute of the Arts
 Documentary:
 Gold Medal: Living Forward, Looking Back, Stephanie L. Hill New York University
 Silver Medal: Chicks in White Satin, Elaine Holliman University of Southern California
 Dramatic: 
 Gold Medal: A Children's Story, Graham Justice New York University
 Silver Medal: Silent Rain, Martin Curland University of Southern California
 Experimental Award:
 Gold Medal: The Strange Case of Balthazar Hyppolite, Ethan Spigland New York University
 Silver Medal: Seven Lucky Charms, Lisa Mann California Institute of the Arts
 Foreign Film Award: The Last New Year, Javier Bourges Centro de Capacitación Cinematográfica, Mexico City, Mexico
 Directors Guild of America Student Award: Graham Justice

21st Annual Student Academy Awards June 12, 1994
 Animation:
 Gold Medal: The Janitor, Vanessa Stella Schwartz California Institute of the Arts
 Silver Medal: Foodchain, Brian P. Dowrick University of the Arts, Philadelphia, Pennsylvania
 Documentary: 
 Gold Medal: Genbaku Shi: Killed by the Atomic Bomb, Casey G. Williams University of Utah
 Silver Medal: Portrait of Boy with Dog, Robin Hessman, James Longley Brown University, Wesleyan University
 Bronze Medal: Street Songs: Pittsburgh Street Singer Bill Dorsey, Craig McTurk California Institute of the Arts
 Dramatic: 
 Gold Medal: Red, Gary Nadeau New York University
 Silver Medal: Outside, Matt Danciger Art Center College of Design, Pasadena, California
 Bronze Medal: The Make, Stephen James Columbia University
 Foreign Film Award: Abgeschminkt (Making Up!), Katja von Garnier University of Television and Film Munich, Munich, Germany
 Directors Guild of America Student Award: Matt Danciger

22nd Annual Student Academy Awards June 11, 1995
 Alternative:
 Gold Medal: Picasso Would Have Made a Glorious Waiter, Jonathan Schell New York University
 Animation: 
 Gold Medal: Card Trick, Robert Herrick Russ University of California, San Diego
 Documentary:
 Gold Medal: Their Own Vietnam, Nancy D. Kates Stanford University
 Silver Medal: Playing the Part, Mitch McCabe Harvard College, Cambridge, Massachusetts
 Dramatic: 
 Gold Medal: La Ciudad (The City), David Riker New York University
 Foreign Film Award: Scarborough Ahoy!, Tania Diez National Film and Television School, Beaconsfield, Buckinghamshire, England
 Directors Guild of America Student Award: David Riker

23rd Annual Student Academy Awards June 9, 1996
 Animation:
 Gold Medal: Patronized, Zachary Lehman Dartmouth College
 Silver Medal: Return of the Sun Devil, Steven Ayromlooi Rhode Island School of Design
 Documentary:
 Gold Medal: Independent Little Cuss, Jeff Patterson Loyola Marymount University
 Silver Medal: Just for the Ride, Amanda Micheli Harvard University
 Bronze Medal: Spirits Rising, Ramona S. Diaz Stanford University
 Dramatic
 Gold Medal: The Water Carrier, Patricia Cardoso University of California, Los Angeles
 Silver Medal: Short Change, Jon Andrews Yale University
 Bronze Medal: Around the Time, Phil Bertelsen New York University
 Alternative: 
 Gold Medal: Eclipse, Jason Ruscio New York University
 Silver Medal: Memories of Matthews Place, Daniel Bova New York University
 Foreign Film Award: Grænsen (Never), Reza Parsa National Film School of Denmark
 Directors Guild of America Student Award: Patricia Cardoso

24th Annual Student Academy Awards June 8, 1997
 Alternative:
 Gold Medal: Erosion, Robert Gelber New York University
 Silver Medal: My Divorce, Andrea Clark New York University
 Animation: 
 Gold Medal: Unborn Baby Blues, Mark Dale Levine University of California, Los Angeles
 Documentary:
 Gold Medal: Walk This Way, Chris Sheridan Scottsdale Community College
 Silver Medal: Miriam Is Not Amused, Kim Roberts Stanford University
 Bronze Medal: The Mirror Lied, Jennifer Haskin-O'Reggio University of Southern California
 Dramatic: 
 Gold Medal: Christmas in New York, Mark Millhone Columbia University
 Silver Medal: Waiting in the Wings, Charles R. Uy School of Visual Arts, New York City
 Bronze Medal: Mr. October, Chris Angel University of Southern California
 Foreign Film Award: An Ordinary Mission, Raymond Boy Academy of Media Arts, Cologne, Germany
 Directors Guild of America Student Award: Charles R. Uy

25th Annual Student Academy Awards June 14, 1998
 Alternative
 Gold Medal: Sombra, Robin Larsen University of California, Los Angeles
 Animation:
 Gold Medal: Jataka, Peter Choe, Neal Nellans Ringling School of Art and Design, Sarasota, Florida
 Silver Medal: Switchback, Kyle Clark University of Southern California
 Bronze Medal: Put On a Happy Face, Suzanne Lee Twining University of the Arts, Philadelphia, Pennsylvania
 Documentary: 
 Gold Medal: Fighting Grandpa, Greg Pak New York University
 Silver Medal: Occidental Encounters, Yuriko Gamo Romer Stanford University
 Bronze Medal: Wayne Freedman's Notebook, Aaron Lubarsky Stanford University
Dramatic: 
 Gold Medal: Bleach, Bill Platt New York University
 Silver Medal: My Body, Joel Moffett, Matthias Visser American Film Institute
 Bronze Medal: Intermezzo, Dana H. Glazer New York University
 Foreign Film Award: Rochade, Thorsten Schmidt Film Academy Baden-Württemberg (Ludwigsburg, Baden-Württemberg, Germany)
 Directors Guild of America Student Award: Bill Platt

26th Annual Student Academy Awards June 13, 1999
 Alternative:
 Gold Medal: Tree Shade, Lisa Collins Columbia University, New York City
 Silver Medal: The Piece, Jordan Waid The New School, New York City
 Bronze Medal: Atomic Tobasco, James Cox New York University
 Bronze Medal: Gregory, Marston Younger Allan Hancock College
 Animation: 
 Gold Medal: A Letter from the Western Front, Daniel M. Kanemoto New York University
 Silver Medal: Between the Lines, Jamie Maxfield California Institute of the Arts
 Bronze Medal: Shadow of a Drought, Daniel Kutner, Brian Emerson University of California, Santa Barbara
 Documentary: 
 Gold Medal: Man and Dog, Randolph Benson North Carolina School of the Arts
 Narrative: 
 Gold Medal: John, Marni Banack, J. B. Sugar American Film Institute
 Silver Medal: True Confessions of a Sushi Addict, Kimberly Harwood New York University
 Bronze Medal: Slow Dancin' Down the Aisles of the Quickcheck, Thomas Wade Jackson Florida State University
 Foreign Film Award: Kleingeld (Small Change), Marc-Andreas Bochert Konrad Wolf Film University of Babelsberg, Germany
 Directors Guild of America Student Award: Marni Banack 
 American Society of Cinematographers Student Award: David A. Armstrong

2000s

27th Annual Student Academy Awards June 11, 2000
 Alternative:
 Gold Medal: Helicopter, Ari Gold New York University
 Silver Medal: Dear Sir: Letters to a Union Soldier, Michael Mullan, Jessica Lakis University of the Arts, Philadelphia, Pennsylvania
 Animation:
 Gold Medal: Al Tudi Tuhak (Long, Long Ago), Tod Polson California Institute of the Arts
 Silver Medal (tie): The Bad Plant, Amy Winfrey University of California, Los Angeles
 Silver Medal (tie): Luz, Jose Javier Martinez University of California, Los Angeles
 Documentary:
 Gold Medal: Iron Ladies, Kennedy Wheatley University of Southern California
 Silver Medal: Slender Existence, Laura C. Murray Stanford University, Palo Alto, California
 Bronze Medal: Between Two Fires, Douglas Noel Smith Regent University, Virginia, Virginia
 Narrative:
 Gold Medal: One Day Crossing, Joan L. Stein Columbia University
 Silver Medal: Homeland, Doug Scott New York University
 Bronze Medal: 6 Miles of 8 Feet, Ben Tomlin New York University
 Foreign: Quiero ser, Florian Gallenberger University of Television and Film Munich, Germany
 Directors Guild of America Student Award: Joan L. Stein

28th Annual Student Academy Awards June 10, 2001
 Alternative:
 Gold Medal: Warmth, Michael Schaerer School of Visual Arts, New York City
 Animation:
 Gold Medal: Boobie Girl, Brooke Keesling California Institute of the Arts
 Silver Medal: The Yellow Umbrella, Victor Robert, Rodney Hom Art Center College of Design, Pasadena, California
 Bronze Medal: That Special Monkey, Sean McBride University of the Arts, Philadelphia, Pennsylvania
 Documentary:
 Gold Medal: XXXY, Porter Gale, Laleh Soomekh Stanford University, Palo Alto, California
 Silver Medal: Green, Laura Dunn University of Texas at Austin
 Bronze Medal: Undesirables, Marianna Yarovskaya University of Southern California, Los Angeles
 Narrative:
 Gold Medal: Zen and the Art of Landscaping, David Kartch Columbia University
 Silver Medal: The Confession, Carl Pfirman University of California, Los Angeles
 Bronze Medal: Lector, Greg Marcks Florida State University, Tallahassee
 Foreign Film Award: The Eye on the Nape (El ojo en la nuca), Rodrigo Pla Centro de Capacitación Cinematográfica (Mexico City, Mexico)

29th Annual Student Academy Awards June 9, 2002
 Alternative:
 Gold Medal: For Our Man, Kazuo Ohno Columbia University
 Silver Medal: Island to Island, Soopum Sohn New York University
 Animation:
 Gold Medal: Passing Moments, Don Phillips, Jr. Ringling School of Art and Design
 Silver Medal: The Velvet Tigress, Jen Sachs California Institute of the Arts, Valencia
 Bronze Medal: Shadowplay, Dan Blank New York University
 Documentary:
 Gold Medal: Moving House, Pin Pin Tan Northwestern University 
 Silver Medal: Family Values, Eva Saks New York University
 Bronze Medal: Revolutions Per Minute, Thomas Burns Stanford University, Palo Alto, California
 Narrative:
 Gold Medal: The Wormhole, Jessica Sharzer New York University
 Silver Medal: Barrier Device, Grace Lee University of California, Los Angeles
 Bronze Medal: Sophie Helen, Haeyoung Lee University of Texas at Austin
 Foreign Film Award: Feeding Desire, Martin Strange-Hansen National Film School of Denmark, Denmark

30th Annual Student Academy Awards June 8, 2003
 Alternative:
 Gold Medal: The Projects Lumiere, Waleed Moursi California Institute of the Arts
 Animation:
 Gold Medal: Perpetual Motion, Kimberly Miner Rochester Institute of Technology
 Silver Medal: Bert, Moonsung Lee Academy of Art College, San Francisco.
 Bronze Medal: A Work in Progress, Wes Ball Florida State University, Tallahassee
 Documentary:
 Gold Medal: Left Behind, Christof Putzel Connecticut College
 Silver Medal: Indiana Aria, Elizabeth Pollock University of California, Berkeley
 Bronze Medal: Those Who Trespass, Renee Fischer Stanford University, Palo Alto, California
 Narrative:
 Gold Medal: La Milpa (The Cornfield), Patricia Riggen Columbia University
 Silver Medal: Jesus Henry Christ, Dennis Lee Columbia University, New York City
 Bronze Medal: Fine., Michael Downing, Philip Svoboda American Film Institute, California
 Foreign Film Award: The Red Jacket, Florian Baxmeyer University of Hamburg, Germany

31st Annual Student Academy Awards June 13, 2004
 Alternative:
 Gold Medal: The Storyboard of My Life, Robert F. Castillo School of Visual Arts
 Silver Medal: Focus, Bill Ridlehoover, Nilanjan Neil Lahiri Savannah College of Art and Design, Georgia
 Animation:
 Gold Medal: Rex Steele: Nazi Smasher, Alexander Woo New York University
 Silver Medal: Rock the World, Sukwon Shin School of Visual Arts, New York City
 Bronze Medal: Lemmings, Craig Van Dyke BYU Center for Animation, Utah
 Documentary:
 Gold Medal: Cheerleader, Kimberlee Bassford University of California, Berkeley
 Silver Medal: When the Storm Came, Shilpi Gupta University of California, Berkeley
 Bronze Medal: Cuba: Illogical Temple, David Pittock, Lindsey Kealy University of Nebraska–Lincoln
 Narrative:
 Gold Medal: A-Alike, Randall Dottin Columbia University
 Silver Medal: Zeke, Dana Buning Florida State University, Tallahassee
 Bronze Medal: The Plunge, Todd Schulman Florida State University, Tallahassee
 Foreign Film Award: Between Us, Laurits Much-Peterson National Film School of Denmark, Denmark

32nd Annual Student Academy Awards June 12, 2005
 Alternative:
 Gold Medal: Knock Knock, Jaron Henrie-McCrea Ball State University
 Silver Medal: Your Dark Hair Ihsan, Tala Hadid Columbia University
 Animation:
 Gold Medal: 9, Shane Acker University of California
 Silver Medal: Frog, Christopher Conforti School of Visual Arts, New York City
 Bronze Medal: Things That Go Bump in the Night, Joshua G. Beveridge Ringling School of Art and Design, Florida
 Documentary:
 Gold Medal: The Life of Kevin Carter, Dan Krauss University of California
 Silver Medal: Unhitched, Erin Hudso, Ben Wu Stanford University 
 Bronze Medal: Listen, Kimby Caplan Southern Methodist University, Texas
 Narrative:
 Gold Medal: Wednesday Afternoon, Alonso Mayo  American Film Institute
 Silver Medal: Victoria Para Chino, Cary Fukunaga New York University
 Bronze Medal: Charm, Melissa Rossi Florida State University, Tallahassee
 Foreign Film Award: The Runaway, Ulrike Grote University of Hamburg, Germany

33rd Annual Student Academy Awards June 10, 2006
 Alternative:
 Gold Medal: Perspective, Travis Hatfield, Samuel Day Ball State University
 Silver Medal: 6 A.M., Carmen Vidal Balanzat City College of New York
 Animation:
 Gold Medal: The Possum, Chris Choy California Institute of the Arts
 Silver Medal: The Dancing Thief, Meng Vue Ringling School of Art and Design
 Bronze Medal: Turtles, Thomas Leavitt BYU Center for Animation
 Documentary:
 Gold Medal: Reporter Zero, Carrie Lozano University of California, Berkeley
 Silver Medal: The Women's Kingdom, Xiaoli Zhou University of California, Berkeley
 Bronze Medal: Three Beauties, Mak Hossain Purdue University
 Narrative:
 Gold Medal: Christmas Wish List, Sean Overbeeke University of North Carolina
 Silver Medal: El Viaje (One Day Trip), Cady Abarca-Benavides Columbia University
 Bronze Medal: Pop Foul, Moon Molson, Jennifer Handorf Columbia University
 Foreign Film Award: Elalini, Tristan Holmes South African School of Motion Picture Medium and Live Performance, South Africa

34th Annual Student Academy Awards June 9, 2007
 Alternative:
 Gold Medal: Fission, Kun-I Chang School of Visual Arts
 Animation:
 Gold Medal (tie): Arts Desire, Sarah Wickliffe New York University
 Gold Medal (tie): Mirage, Youngwoong Jang School of Visual Arts
 Silver Medal: A Leg Up, Bevin Carnes Ringling College of Art and Design
 Documentary:
 Gold Medal: Cross Your Eyes Keep Them Wide, Ben Wu Stanford University
 Silver Medal: Ladies of the Land, Megan Thompson New York University
 Bronze Medal: Lumo, Bent-Jorgen Perlmutt, Nelson Walker III Columbia University
 Narrative:
 Gold Medal: Rundown, Patrick Alexander Florida State University
 Silver Medal: High Maintenance, Phillip Van New York University
 Bronze Medal: Screening, Anthony Green New York University
 Foreign Film Award: Nevermore, Toke Constantin Hebbeln Film Academy Baden-Württemberg, Germany

35th Annual Student Academy Awards June 7, 2008
 Alternative:
 Gold Medal: Viola: The Traveling Rooms of a Little Giant, Shih-Ting Hung University of Southern California
 Silver Medal: Circles of Confusion, Phoebe Tooke San Francisco State University
 Animation:
 Gold Medal: Zoologic, Nicole Mitchell California Institute of the Arts
 Silver Medal: Simulacra, Tatchapon Lertwirojkul School of Visual Arts, New York City
 Bronze Medal: The Visionary, Evan Mayfield Ringling College of Art and Design, Florida
 Documentary:
 Gold Medal: As We Forgive, Laura Waters Hinson American University, Washington, D.C. 
 Silver Medal: Unattached, J.J. Adler Columbia University
 Bronze Medal: If a Body Meet a Body, Brian Davis University of Southern California
 Narrative:
 Gold Medal: A Day's Work, Rajeev Dassani University of Southern California
 Silver Medal: The State of Sunshine, Z. Eric Yang Florida State University
 Bronze Medal: Pitstop, Melanie McGraw University of Southern California
 Foreign Film Award: On the Line (Auf der Strecke), Reto Caffi Academy of Media Arts Cologne, Germany

36th Annual Student Film Awards June 13, 2009
 Alternative:
 Gold Medal: Alice's Attic, Robyn Yannoukos University of California Los Angeles
 Silver Medal: Matter, In a Quiescent State, Prepares Itself to Be Transformed, Kwibum Chung School of Visual Arts, New York City
 Animation:
 Gold Medal: Pajama Gladiator, Glenn Harmon BYU Center for Animation
 Silver Medal: Sebastian’s Voodoo, Joaquin Baldwin University of California, Los Angeles
 Bronze Medal: Kites, Jed Henry BYU Center for Animation
 Documentary:
 Gold Medal: The Last Mermaids, Liz Chae Columbia University
 Silver Medal: The Wait, Cassandra Lizaire, Kelly AsmuthColumbia University, New York City
 Bronze Medal: A Place to Land, Lauren DeAngelis American University, Washington, D.C.
 Narrative:
 Gold Medal: Kavi, Gregg Helvey University of Southern California
 Silver Medal: The Bronx Balletomane, Jeremy Joffee City College of New York
 Bronze Medal: Bohemibot, Brendan Bellomo New York University
 Foreign Film Award: Elkland, Per Hanefjord Swedish Institute of Dramatic Art, Sweden

2010s

37th Annual Student Film Awards June 12, 2010
 Alternative:
 Gold Medal: Surface: Film from Below, Varathit Uthaisri Parsons The New School for Design
 Silver Medal: Multiply, Emily Henricks University of Southern California
 Animation:
 Gold Medal: Departure of Love, Jennifer Bors Ringling College of Art and Design
 Silver Medal: Dried Up, Isaiah Powers, Stuart Bury and Jeremy Casper Kansas City Art Institute
 Bronze Medal: Lifeline, Andres Salaff California Institute of the Arts
 Documentary:
 Gold Medal: Yizkor (Remembrance), Ruth Fertig University of Texas at Austin
 Silver Medal: Rediscovering Pape, Maria Royo City College of New York
 Bronze Medal: Dreams Awake (Suena Despierto), Kevin Gordon and Rebekah Meredith Stanford University
 Narrative:
 Gold Medal: God of Love, Luke Matheny New York University
 Silver Medal: Down in Number 5, Kim Spurlock New York University
 Bronze Medal: The Lunch Box, Lubomir Kocka Savannah College of Art and Design
 Foreign Film Award: The Confession, Tanel Toom National Film and Television School, United Kingdom

38th Annual Student Film Awards June 11, 2011
 Alternative: 
 Gold Medal: The Vermeers, Tal S. Shamir  The New School
 Animation: 
 Gold Medal: Dragonboy, Bernardo Warman and Shaofu Zhang  Academy of Art University 
 Silver Medal: Correspondence, Zach Hyer  Pratt Institute
 Bronze Medal: Defective Detective, Avner Geller and Stevie Lewis  Ringling College of Art and Design
 Documentary:
 Gold Medal: Vera Klement: Blunt Edge, Wonjung Bae Columbia College
 Silver Medal: Imaginary Circumstances, Anthony Weeks Stanford University
 Bronze Medal: Sin Pais (Without Country), Theo Rigby Stanford University
 Foreign Film Award:
 Gold Medal: Tuba Atlantic, Halvar Witzø  Norwegian Film School, Norway
 Silver Medal: Bekas, Karzan Kader  Stockholm Academy of Dramatic Arts, Sweden
 Bronze Medal: Raju, Max Zähle  Hamburg Media School, Germany
 Narrative:
 Gold Medal: Thief, Julian Higgins  American Film Institute
 Silver Medal: High Maintenance, Shawn Wines  Columbia University 
 Bronze Medal: Fatakra, Soham Mehta  University of Texas at Austin

39th Annual Student Film Awards June 9, 2012
 Alternative: 
 Gold Medal: The Reality Clock, Amanda Tasse  University of Southern California
 Animation: 
 Gold Medal: Eyrie, David Wolter  California Institute of the Arts 
 Silver Medal:The Jockstrap Raiders, Mark Nelson  University of California, Los Angeles
 Bronze Medal:My Little Friend, Eric Prah  Ringling College of Art and Design
 Documentary:
 Gold Medal: Dying Green, Ellen Tripler American University
 Silver Medal: Hiro: A Story of Japanese Internment, Keiko Wright New York University
 Bronze Medal: Lost Country, Heather Burky Art Institute of Jacksonville
 Narrative:
 Gold Medal: Under, Mark Raso  Columbia University
 Silver Medal: Narcocorrido, Ryan Prows  American Film Institute 
 Bronze Medal: Nani, Justin Tipping American Film Institute
 Foreign Film Award:
 Gold Medal: For Elsie, David Winstone  University of Westminster, United Kingdom
 Silver Medal: Of Dogs and Horses, Thomas Stuber  Film Academy Baden-Württemberg, Germany
 Bronze Medal: The Swing of the Coffin Maker, Elmar Imanov  Internationale Filmschule Köln, Cologne, Germany

40th Annual Student Film Awards June 8, 2013
 Alternative: 
 Gold Medal: Bottled Up, Raffy Cortina  Occidental College
 Silver Medal: Zug, Perry Janes  University of Michigan
 Bronze Medal: The Compositor, John Mattiuzzi  School of Visual Arts
 Animation: 
 Gold Medal: Dias de los muertos, Lindsey St. Pierre and Ashley Graham  Ringling College of Art and Design 
 Silver Medal:Will, Eusong Lee  California Institute of the Arts
 Bronze Medal: Peck Pocketed, Kevin Herron  Ringling College of Art and Design
 Documentary:
 Gold Medal: A Second Chance, David Aristizabal  University of Southern California
 Silver Medal: Every Tuesday: A Portrait of the New Yorker Cartoonists, Rachel Loube  School of Visual Arts
 Bronze Medal: Win or Lose, Daniel Koehler  Elon University
 Narrative:
 Gold Medal: Ol' Daddy, Brian Schwarz  University of Texas at Austin
 Silver Medal: Josephine and the Roach, Jonathan Langager  University of Southern California 
 Bronze Medal: Un mundo para Raúl, Mauro Mueller Columbia University
 Foreign Film Award:
 Gold Medal: Miss Todd, Kristina Yee  National Film and Television School, United Kingdom
 Silver Medal: Parvaneh, Talkhon Hamzavi  Zürcher Hochschule der Künste, Fachrichtung Film, Zurich, Switzerland
 Bronze Medal: Crossroads (Tweesprong), Wouter Bouvijn  RITS School of Arts, Erasmus University College, Belgium

41st Annual Student Film Awards June 6, 2014
 Alternative: 
 Gold Medal: Person, Drew Brown  The Art Institute of Jacksonville
 Silver Medal: Oscillate, Daniel Sierra  School of Visual Arts
 Animation: 
 Gold Medal: Owned, Daniel Clark and Wesley Tippetts  BYU Center for Animation 
 Silver Medal:Higher Sky, Teng Cheng  University of Southern California
 Bronze Medal: Yamashita, Hayley Foster  Loyola Marymount University
 Documentary:
 Gold Medal: The Apothecary, Helen Hood Scheer  Stanford University
 Silver Medal: White Earth, J. Christian Jensen  Stanford University
 Bronze Medal: One Child, Zijian Mu  New York University
 Foreign Film Award:
 Gold Medal: Nocebo, Lennart Ruff  University of Television and Film Munich, Germany
 Silver Medal: Paris on the Water, Hadas Ayalon  Tel Aviv University, Israel
 Bronze Medal: Border Patrol, Peter Baumann  Northern Film School, United Kingdom
 Narrative:
 Gold Medal: Above the Sea, Keola Racela  Columbia University
 Silver Medal: Door God, Yulin Liu  New York University 
 Bronze Medal: Interstate, Camille Stochitch American Film Institute

42nd Annual Student Film Awards September 17, 2015
 Alternative: 
 Gold Medal: Chiaroscuro, Daniel Drummond  Chapman University
 Silver Medal: Zoe, ChiHyun Lee  School of Visual Arts
 Animation: 
 Gold Medal: Soar, Alyce Tzue  Academy of Art University 
 Silver Medal:An Object at Rest, Seth Boyden  California Institute of the Arts
 Bronze Medal: Taking the Plunge, Nicholas Manfredi and Elizabeth Ku-Herrero  School of Visual Arts
 Documentary:
 Gold Medal: Looking at the Stars, Alexandre Peralta  University of Southern California
 Silver Medal: I Married My Family’s Killer, Emily Kassie  Brown University
 Bronze Medal: Boxeadora, Meg Smaker  Stanford University
 Foreign Film Award:
 Gold Medal: Fidelity, Ilker Çatak  Hamburg Media School, Germany
 Silver Medal: The Last Will, Dustin Loose  Filmakademie Baden-Wuerttemberg, Germany
 Bronze Medal: Everything Will Be Okay, Patrick Vollrath  Filmakademie Wien, Austria
 Narrative:
 Gold Medal: Day One, Henry Hughes, edited by Anisha AcharyaAmerican Film Institute
 Silver Medal: This Way Up, Jeremy Cloe  American Film Institute 
 Bronze Medal: Stealth, Bennett Lasseter  American Film Institute

43rd Annual Student Film Awards September 22, 2016

44th Annual Student Film Awards October 12, 2017

45th Annual Student Film Awards October 11, 2018

46th Annual Student Film Awards October 17, 2019

2020s

47th Annual Student Film Awards October 21, 2020

48th Annual Student Film Awards October 21, 2021

See also 

 List of film awards

References

External links
Student Academy Awards official site
Student Academy Awards at The Internet Movie Database

Honorary Academy Awards
Student media awards
Awards established in 1973